The Taiwanese Ambassador to Saint Kitts and Nevis is the official representative of the Republic of China to the Federation of Saint Christopher and Nevis.

List of representatives

References 

Saint Kitts and Nevis
China